Chrysoula Katsavria-Sioropoulou (born 7 August 1959 in Anavra) is a Greek politician. 

In the January 2015 Greek legislative election she was elected as a member of the Hellenic Parliament with SYRIZA representing the constituency of Karditsa. She was reelected in the September 2015 Greek legislative election.

References 

1959 births
Living people
People from Magnesia (regional unit)
Syriza politicians
Greek MPs 2015 (February–August)
Greek MPs 2015–2019